Macau Catholic Schools Association (AECM) was established by the Bishop of Macau Paulo José Tavares during the 1960s.

History

Paulo José Tavares established Federation of Catholic Schools of Macau in 1967 and it was supported by Salesian and Jesuit priests.  After the bishop's death in 1973, the activities of the association were put on hold.  When Arquimínio Rodrigues da Costa became the new bishop of Macau in 1982, the Federation became active again and was renamed Macau Catholic Schools Association.

Purpose
The purpose of the Union is the federation of organizations to unite all the catholic schools which are located in Macau. Moreover, it also promotes moral education, and under the guidance of the bishop, complete cultivation and spread of the Gospel and other related issues.

Membership
Colégio Diocesano de São José 5 
Escola de São José Ka-Ho
Our Lady Of Fatima Girls' School
Colégio Mateus Ricci
Escola São João de Brito
Chan Sui Ki Perpetual Help College
Instituto Salesiano
Escola Estrela do Mar
Yuet Wah College
Escola do Santissimo Rosario
Escola São Paulo
Escola Dom João Paulino
Escola de Santa Teresa
Pui Ching Middle School
Sacred Heart Canossian College (English Section)
Colégio Escola Dom Luis Versiglia
Yuet Wah College, Escola Caritas de Macau
Escola Madalena de Canossa 
Colegio de Santa Rosa de Lima (Chinese Secondary)
Colegio de Santa Rosa de Lima (English Secondary)
Escola Santa Maria Mazzarello 
Schools that are managed by Caritas Macau are members of the Association.

References

External links
 Official Website of Macau Catholic Schools Association
 Associação das Escolas Católicas de Macau (澳門天主教學校聯會). Government Printing Bureau. Portuguese  and Chinese 

Education in Macau
Macanese Roman Catholics